"I'm in Love" is a 1981 single by singer Evelyn "Champagne" King. The single was a hit on three different music charts in the United States, hitting number one on both the Soul and dance charts and number 40 on the Billboard Hot 100. It was the first of two chart entries by King to reach number one on both the Soul and dance charts.

Track listing
12" single PD-12244 (US)

7" single  PB-12243 (US)

Credits and personnel
 Backing vocals – B.J. Nelson
 Guitar – Ira Siegel
 Drums – Leslie Ming 
 Handclaps – Kashif, Lawrence Jones III, Morrie Brown
 Percussion instrument – Bashiri Johnson
 Acoustic piano, electric piano (Fender Rhodes), analog synthesizer (Prophet-5, Moog), analog bass synthesizer (Minimoog) – Kashif
 Music arrangement – Kashif
 Lyrics and music – Kashif Saleem
 Producer – Morrie Brown, Lawrence Jones III (assoc.), Kashif (assoc.)
 Recording studio – Celestial Sounds, New York City
 Sound recording – "Magic Hands", Steve Goldman
 Engineers – Pete Sobel, Cheryl Smith, Dennis O'Donnell 
 Produced for Mighty M Productions (Morrie Brown + Kashif + Paul Lawrence Jones III).

Post-production
 Audio mastering – Sterling Sound, New York City
 Audio mixing – Celestial Sounds, New York City

Charts

Legacy
Janet Jackson sampled "I'm In Love" in her 2004 song "R&B Junkie."

See also
List of number-one dance singles of 1981 (U.S.)
List of number-one R&B singles of 1981 (U.S.)
List of post-disco artists and songs

References

1981 singles
1981 songs
Evelyn "Champagne" King songs
RCA Victor singles
Songs written by Kashif (musician)